WJWJ-FM (89.9 FM) is a non-commercial News/Talk radio station licensed to Beaufort, South Carolina. Its transmitter is located with co-owned WJWJ-TV near Green Pond, South Carolina in Colleton County and is part of the statewide "NPR News network" from South Carolina Public Radio.  It covers most of the southeastern part of the state, including Charleston.  It also provides rimshot coverage of Savannah.

The station began operation in 1980. Along with the SCERN simulcast based in Columbia, WJWJ occasionally broke off to air local shows from SCETV's studios in Beaufort.

In 2001, WJWJ was the first SCERN station to switch to an all-news format as both WSVH in Savannah and WSCI in Charleston provided the entire WJWJ listening area with classical music. However, with the change in formats, all local programming ended, and WJWJ's entire schedule is now fed from Columbia.  It is the only NPR news/talk station in the area.

References

External links
South Carolina Public Radio

JWJ
NPR member stations
News and talk radio stations in the United States
Radio stations established in 1980
1980 establishments in South Carolina